Drusilla canaliculata is a species of rove beetle in the family Staphylinidae. It is found in Europe and Northern Asia (excluding China) and North America.

References

 Brunke A, Marshall S (2011). "Contributions to the faunistics and bionomics of Staphylinidae (Coleoptera) in northeastern North America: discoveries made through study of the University of Guelph Insect Collection, Ontario, Canada". ZooKeys 75: 29–68.
 Gusarov, Vladimir I. (2003). "Revision of some types of North American aleocharines (Coleoptera: Staphylinidae: Aleocharinae), with synonymic notes".
 Klimaszewski J, McLean J, Chandler D, Savard K, Li A (2009). "Survey of rove beetles (Coleoptera, Staphylinidae) from Stanley Park, Vancouver, British Columbia, Canada, with new records and description of a new species. Part 2". ZooKeys 22: 19–33.
 Klimaszewski J, McLean J, Li A, Savard K (2009). "Survey of rove beetles (Coleoptera, Staphylinidae) from Stanley Park, Vancouver, British Columbia, Canada, with new records and description of a new species. Part 1". ZooKeys 22: 5–17.
 Klimaszewski J, Webster R, Assing V, Savard K (2008). "Diglotta mersa (Haliday) and Halobrecta flavipes Thomson, two new species for the Canadian fauna (Coleoptera, Staphylinidae, Aleocharinae)". ZooKeys 2: 175–188.
 Klimaszewski J, Webster R, Savard K (2009). "First record of the genus Schistoglossa Kraatz from Canada with descriptions of seven new species (Coleoptera, Staphylinidae, Aleocharinae)". ZooKeys 22: 45–79.
 Klimaszewski J, Webster R, Savard K (2009). "Review of the rove beetle species of the subtribe Gyrophaenina Kraatz (Coleoptera, Staphylinidae) from New Brunswick, Canada: new species, provincial records and bionomic information". ZooKeys 22: 81–170.
 Majka C, Klimaszewski J (2010). "Contributions to the knowledge of the Aleocharinae (Coleoptera, Staphylinidae) in the Maritime Provinces of Canada". ZooKeys 46: 15–39.
 Muona, J. (1984). "Review of Palearctic Aleocharinae also occurring in North America (Coleoptera: Staphylinidae)". Entomologica Scandinavica, vol. 15, no. 2, 227–231.

Further reading

 Arnett, R. H. Jr., M. C. Thomas, P. E. Skelley and J. H. Frank. (eds.). (21 June 2002). American Beetles, Volume II: Polyphaga: Scarabaeoidea through Curculionoidea. CRC Press LLC, Boca Raton, Florida .
 Arnett, Ross H. (2000). American Insects: A Handbook of the Insects of America North of Mexico. CRC Press.
 Richard E. White. (1983). Peterson Field Guides: Beetles. Houghton Mifflin Company.

Aleocharinae
Beetles described in 1787